Don't Leave Me Now may refer to:

 "Don't Leave Me Now" (Pink Floyd song), 1979
 "Don't Leave Me Now", a song by Elvis Presley from Loving You, 1957
 "Don't Leave Me Now", a song by Supertramp from ...Famous Last Words..., 1982
 "Don't Leave Me Now", a song by Lost Frequencies featuring Mathieu Koss from Cup of Beats, 2020